Theodore P. ("Ted" or "Breit") Breitenstein (June 1, 1869 – May 3, 1935) was an American Major League Baseball pitcher from St. Louis, Missouri who played from  to  for the St. Louis Browns/Cardinals and the Cincinnati Reds. He is best known for throwing a no-hitter in his first Major League start, along with the "Pretzel Battery" with fellow German-American battery mate Heinie Peitz.

Major League Baseball career
During his first season in the majors, Breitenstein pitched occasionally in relief, but on the final day of the 1891 season, October 4, Breitenstein was allowed to start and he pitched a no-hitter against the Louisville Colonels, an 8–0 victory. He faced the minimum number of batters of 27, allowed just one base on balls, which was erased by a double play or by a pickoff play. It was also the last no-hitter thrown in the American Association, as the league folded after the season.

In , he won 27 games while leading the league in games started, complete games and innings pitched, although he led the league in runs allowed, and had a 4.79 ERA. In the following season, his workload stayed the same, leading the league in games started and complete games once again, but his stats took a slide downward, leading the league in runs allowed, base on balls, and losses. His 30 losses in  ranks third on the all-time list for losses in a season by a pitcher.

The move gave him a new start and he took advantage of it, winning more than 20 games in each of his first two season with the Reds. On April 22, 1898, he pitched his second no-hitter, this time against the Pittsburgh Pirates, an 11–0 victory. What made this no-hitter notable is the fact that another no-hitter was pitched on the same day. Jay Hughes of the Baltimore Orioles threw one against the Boston Beaneaters. This was the first occurrence of two no-hitters being thrown on the same day in the major leagues.

Breitenstein's next two seasons in Cincinnati were respectable, but his skills had shown that they were declining, not able to pitch with the same durability of seasons past. Through an unknown transaction, he returned to his old team in St. Louis, now known as the Cardinals.

Later life
Breitenstein went on to a lengthy minor league baseball career, most notably with the New Orleans Pelicans of the Southern Association. He played eight seasons for the Pelicans, ten years in all with the Association. He was then an umpire in the Association. During World War I, Breitenstein was named as a director of an athletic camp especially organized for Army and Navy soldiers. He died in St. Louis, Missouri at the age of 65, and is interred in Saint Peter's Cemetery in Normandy, Missouri.

See also

 List of Major League Baseball annual ERA leaders
 List of Major League Baseball no-hitters
 List of St. Louis Cardinals team records

References

External links

1869 births
1935 deaths
19th-century baseball players
Major League Baseball pitchers
St. Louis Browns (AA) players
St. Louis Browns (NL) players
Cincinnati Reds players
St. Louis Cardinals players
National League ERA champions
Grand Rapids Shamrocks players
Memphis Egyptians players
New Orleans Pelicans (baseball) players
Baseball umpires
Baseball players from St. Louis